The Bernard 18 was a prototype airliner developed in France in the 1920s.  One of the two prototypes built was used in an abortive transatlantic crossing attempt and a number of failed attempts for aerial records.

Development
The aircraft was originally developed in response to a specification for CIDNA for an eight-seat airliner, but the second incarnation of Bernard's aircraft manufacturing company went bankrupt before production could take place.

When the company was revived in 1927, it built a second example specifically for Paul Tarascon to make an attempt at the Orteig Prize. It was also fitted with undercarriage that could be jettisoned after takeoff to save weight. Designated 18GR (for Grand Raid) and christened Oiseau Tango ("Tango Bird", after its bright yellow colour, intended to assist rescue efforts in case of a ditching), it was discovered that with the necessary fuel load, the aircraft could not actually become airborne. After Charles Lindbergh successfully claimed the prize, the 18GR was converted back to standard 18T configuration and sold to an operator in Canada.

Variants
 18T
 18GR

Specifications (18T)

See also

References

Bibliography

External links

 aviafrance.com
 Les avions de record français (1928-1932)

018
1920s French airliners
Single-engined tractor aircraft
High-wing aircraft